Computer-aided or computer-assisted is an adjectival phrase that hints of the use of a computer as an indispensable tool in a certain field, usually derived from more traditional fields of science and engineering. Instead of the phrase computer-aided or computer-assisted, in some cases the suffix management system is used.

Engineering and production
Computer-aided design
 Computer-aided architectural design
 Computer-aided industrial design
 Electronic and electrical computer-aided design
 Computer-aided garden design
Computer-aided drafting
Computer-aided engineering
 Computer-aided production engineering
Computer-aided manufacturing
Computer-aided quality
 Computer-aided maintenance

Music and arts
 Computer-aided algorithmic composition
 Computer-assisted painting

Human languages
 Computer-aided translation

Medicine
 Computer-assisted detection
 Computer-aided diagnosis
 Computer-assisted orthopedic surgery
 Computer-aided patient registration
 Computer-assisted sperm analysis
 Computer-assisted surgery
 Computer-assisted surgical planning
 Computer-aided tomography

Software engineering
 Computer-aided software engineering

Traffic control
 Computer-assisted dispatch

Teaching
 Computer-assisted instruction
 Computer-assisted learning, better known as computer-based learning
 Computer-assisted language learning
 Computer-assisted assessment

Mathematics
 Computer-assisted proof
 Computer-aided learning

Economy
 Computer-assisted auditing techniques
 Computer-assisted mass appraisal

Communications
 Computer-assisted personal interviewing
 Computer-assisted telephone interviewing
 Computer-assisted reporting

Security
 Computer-Assisted Passenger Prescreening System

Law
 Computer-assisted legal research

Entertainment
 Computer-assisted gaming
 Computer-assisted role-playing game

Prefixes